Viktor Olegovich Sergeyev (born 18 April 1993) is a Russian football forward. He plays for FC Salyut Belgorod.

Club career
He made his debut in the Russian Second Division for FC Sibir-2 Novosibirsk on 22 April 2013 in a game against FC Amur-2010 Blagoveshchensk.

He made his Russian Football National League debut for FC Olimpiyets Nizhny Novgorod on 17 March 2018 in a game against FC Orenburg.

Honours
 2016–17 Russian Professional Football League, Zone Center best player.

References

External links
 
 

1993 births
People from Stary Oskol
Sportspeople from Belgorod Oblast
Living people
Russian footballers
Association football forwards
FC Sibir Novosibirsk players
FC Nizhny Novgorod (2015) players
FC Energomash Belgorod players
FC Mordovia Saransk players
FC Armavir players
FC Volgar Astrakhan players
FC Tekstilshchik Ivanovo players
FC Salyut Belgorod players
Russian First League players
Russian Second League players